Musemić is a Bosnian surname. Notable people with the surname include:

Husref Musemić (born 1961), Bosnian footballer and manager
Vahidin Musemić (born 1946), Bosnian footballer

Bosnian surnames